The Secret Life of Walter Mitty is a 2013 American adventure comedy-drama film directed, co-produced by and starring Ben Stiller and written by Steve Conrad. The film also stars Kristen Wiig, Shirley MacLaine, Adam Scott, Kathryn Hahn, and Sean Penn. It is the second film adaptation of James Thurber's 1939 short story of the same name, following the 1947 film.

Following its world premiere at the New York Film Festival on October 5, 2013, The Secret Life of Walter Mitty was theatrically released by 20th Century Fox on December 25, 2013, in North America to generally mixed reception. It was chosen by the National Board of Review as one of the top ten films of 2013.

Plot

Walter Mitty is a negative assets manager at Life magazine living alone in New York City. He chronically daydreams and has a secret crush on Cheryl Melhoff, a coworker. Walter attempts to contact Cheryl via eHarmony but eHarmony customer service agent Todd Mahar explains that Walter's account is not fully filled out: the "been there" and "done that" sections are blank.

Walter works with legendary photojournalist Sean O'Connell, although they have never met in person. At work later that day, Walter receives a negative roll from Sean with a wallet as a gift in appreciation of Walter's work over the years. A letter from Sean explains that he believes negative #25 captures the "quintessence of life and should be used for the cover of the magazine's final print issue before it becomes exclusively digital, yet the negative is missing from the roll. Ted Hendricks, the obnoxious manager of the magazine's transition, has also heard Sean's recommendation. When he asks about #25, Walter stalls and lies, worried about being fired. Walter then asks Cheryl for help, and she suggests that Walter use the other negatives as clues to Sean's location. He and Hernando, his understudy, are stumped by a negative depicting a curve, until they notice another containing the name of a ship registered in Greenland. Walter reluctantly takes a plane there.

A bartender in Nuuk explains that Sean left on a ship. To find him, Mitty would need to go on the postal helicopter, and the pilot is drunk. Mitty recognizes the pilot's thumb from one of the negatives, and after hesitating, joins the pilot on a trip to bring supplies to the ship. Walter accidentally jumps into ice-cold, shark-infested waters, losing the ship's supplies and preventing radio communication when he finally comes aboard. There, Walter learns that Sean departed the ship a few days earlier and deduces from notes on wrapping paper for a clementine cake Sean left behind that he is heading to Iceland to photograph the volcano Eyjafjallajökull. Walter bikes, skateboards, and runs through the Icelandic countryside to find Sean, but just misses him as the volcano erupts. Dejected, he returns home.

Ted assumes that Walter misplaced the negative and fires him. He tries to visit Cheryl, but spots her ex-husband and leaves before talking to her. Walter visits his mother and throws away the wallet from Sean. To his surprise, Walter recognizes the curve of the piano in his mother's house while looking at the last negative. When asked, she tells Walter that she met Sean and baked him the clementine cake. She had told Walter earlier, but he was daydreaming.

Walter figures out from the notes that Sean is in the Afghan Himalayas and finds him photographing a rare snow leopard. When asked about the negative, Sean explains that, attempting to be playful, he had placed the negative in the wallet. He decides not to tell Walter what the picture actually depicts. When Walter returns to America, the airport security at Los Angeles detains him for arriving from Afghanistan. To verify his identity, Walter calls the only person he knows in Los Angeles: Todd, who has kept in contact during Mitty's travels. The two chat and Todd expresses admiration for how adventurous Walter appears.

Walter receives the wallet from his mother, who had retrieved it from the trash, and finally obtains the negative but chooses not to see it. Emboldened, he delivers it to Lifes offices and berates Hendricks for disrespecting the staff that made the magazine so honored.

Walter reunites with Cheryl, and thanks her for inspiring him on his journey. Cheryl eagerly asks about his adventures and tells him that her ex-husband had only been at her house to help with repairs. Walking along the street, they see the final print issue on sale at a newsstand, and on its cover, they see the photograph from #25 for the first time: it shows Walter sitting outside of the Life building, examining a contact sheet; the magazine is dedicated to Lifes staff, and Sean's note actually referred to "quintessence of Life". Walter and Cheryl continue their walk holding hands.

Cast

 Ben Stiller as Walter Mitty, a negative asset manager at Life
 Kristen Wiig as Cheryl Melhoff, Walter's love interest and co-worker
 Shirley MacLaine as Edna Mitty, Walter's mother
 Adam Scott as Ted Hendricks, Managing Director of the 'Transition' to Life Online
 Kathryn Hahn as Odessa Mitty, Walter's sister
 Patton Oswalt as Todd Maher, an eHarmony customer service representative
 Adrian Martinez as Hernando, Walter's understudy and co-worker
 Ólafur Darri Ólafsson as a drunken Greenlandic helicopter pilot
 Sean Penn as Sean O'Connell, a photojournalist
 Jon Daly as Tim Naughton, one of Walter's co-workers
 Terence Bernie Hines as Gary Mannheim, one of Walter's co-workers
 Marcus Antturi as Rich Melhoff, Cheryl's son
 Kai Lennox as Phil Melhoff, Cheryl's ex-husband
 Conan O'Brien as himself
 Andy Richter as himself
 Joey Slotnick as a retirement home administrator
 Radio Man as himself, a Newsstand operator

Production

Development
Producer Samuel Goldwyn, Jr., whose father produced the 1947 film adaptation, conceived the idea of doing a remake in 1994; he had Jim Carrey in mind for the title role. Walt Disney Pictures was eager to purchase the remake rights, but Goldwyn instead chose New Line Cinema, which had a positive working relationship with Carrey on Dumb and Dumber and The Mask (both 1994). New Line Cinema bought the rights in 1995 with the understanding that The Samuel Goldwyn Company would be involved in creative decisions. Babaloo Mandel and Lowell Ganz turned in the first draft of the screenplay in July 1997. Ron Howard entered negotiations to direct the same month, and to cover producing duties with Brian Grazer and Imagine Entertainment. Howard and Imagine Entertainment eventually left the project in favor of EDtv, and The Secret Life of Walter Mitty languished in development hell over the challenges of using a contemporary storyline.

In May 1999, New Line hired The Mask director Chuck Russell to rewrite the script and serve as Howard's replacement. Filming was set to begin in early 2000, but was pushed back. Around this time, Peter Tolan worked on rewrites. In May 2001, Goldwyn filed a lawsuit against New Line for breach of contract. Goldwyn claimed that the studio extended their 1995 deal until May 2001, but then announced that it wanted to transfer the rights for the remake to another company and have Goldwyn surrender his creative input. In November 2002, New Line was forced to revert the film rights back to Goldwyn, who won his lawsuit and took the property to Paramount Pictures. During pre-production discussions between Paramount and DreamWorks on Lemony Snicket's A Series of Unfortunate Events (which starred Carrey), Steven Spielberg, head of DreamWorks, rekindled interest in working with Carrey; the duo previously considered Meet the Parents, but the outing fell apart. In May 2003, Spielberg agreed to direct, and brought in DreamWorks to co-finance The Secret Life of Walter Mitty with Paramount (which would acquire DreamWorks in 2006).

By November 2003, Zach Helm was rewriting the script, but Spielberg and DreamWorks vacated the film in April 2004 in favor of War of the Worlds and Munich. "The goal is to go back to the short story and capture not only the content but the original spirit," producer John Goldwyn (son of Samuel) told The Hollywood Reporter. Screenwriter Richard LaGravenese entered discussion to write a new script following Spielberg's departure. Samuel Goldwyn commented that LaGravenese's script had a momentous and unique approach compared to others. "I'd always felt that unless we got a great script, the movie disintegrates into a series of wonderful gags," Goldwyn explained. "Writers always fixated on that. [Richard] worked for 10 months on umpteen drafts, and he solved it." In March 2005, Paramount hired Mark Waters to direct LaGravenese's script for Walter Mitty, but Carrey had to drop out due to scheduling conflicts. He was soon replaced by Owen Wilson.

Despite not having a final budget, Paramount scheduled a December 12, 2005, start date because their option on the remake rights was to end one week later; they would lose the rights if they did not start filming before December 20. Wilson dropped out in October 2005 over creative differences. The Hollywood Reporter also speculated that Walter Mitty began to falter after Paramount failed to cast a female lead to star opposite Wilson. Scarlett Johansson had emerged as the front-runner for the role of Cheryl Melhoff after screen testing with Wilson earlier in October, but a deal was never signed with the actress. Paramount executives Brad Grey and Gail Berman decided to put Walter Mitty in turnaround in November 2005. Goldwyn found favor at 20th Century Fox and, in May 2007, it was announced that Mike Myers was attached to star in the title role. Jay Kogen was hired to write a new script that would be specifically tailored for Myers.

In April 2010, Sacha Baron Cohen was offered and accepted the lead role. Later that month, The Pursuit of Happyness writer Steven Conrad was hired to pen the screenplay, with Gore Verbinski announced as director in June 2010.

In April 2011, it was announced that Ben Stiller had been cast in the lead role, though no director was attached. The following July, it was announced that Stiller was also going to direct the film.

Pre-production
In January 2012, it was announced that Kristen Wiig would play the female lead, with Shirley MacLaine to play Walter's mother. This was followed by reports in February that Patton Oswalt and Adam Scott had joined the film. In April 2012, Kathryn Hahn was cast as Odessa, Walter's sister, and Josh Charles was cast as the ex-husband of Kristen Wiig's character, though he was replaced by Kai Lennox. Later that month, Sean Penn was cast in what was described as a "small but pivotal supporting role" as photojournalist Sean O'Connell.

The portions of the film set in Nuuk, Greenland, were in fact shot in Stykkishólmur, a village on the Snæfellsnes peninsula in Iceland, and Höfn, a village in southeast Iceland. Later sequences set in Stykkishólmur were actually filmed in Seyðisfjörður. The sequences where Walter Mitty follows Sean to Afghanistan were also filmed in Iceland, at the Skogafoss waterfall and in Vatnajökull National Park.

During the skateboarding scene in Central Park, pro skater Rodney Mullen served as Ben Stiller's stunt double.

Release
In April 2013, nearly 20 minutes of footage was presented by Fox at CinemaCon in Las Vegas, followed by a theatrical trailer release in July, both of which began to spark awards speculation.

The film made its world premiere as the Centerpiece Gala presentation at the New York Film Festival on October 5, 2013. It was also selected to serve as the Centerpiece Gala presentation at the 2013 AFI Film Festival.

Marketing
20th Century Fox hired filmmaker Casey Neistat to make a promotional video based on the theme of "live your dreams", but Neistat suggested instead to spend the budget on bringing disaster relief to the Philippines in the wake of Typhoon Haiyan. Fox agreed and gave him a budget of $25,000.

Home media
The Secret Life of Walter Mitty was released on DVD and Blu-ray on April 15, 2014, by 20th Century Fox Home Entertainment.

Reception

Critical response
The Secret Life of Walter Mitty received polarized reviews from critics. Review aggregator Rotten Tomatoes gives the film a score of 52% based on reviews from 198 critics, with an average rating of 6.00/10. The site's consensus reads: "It doesn't lack for ambition, but The Secret Life of Walter Mitty fails to back up its grand designs with enough substance to anchor the spectacle." Metacritic gives the film a normalized score of 54 out of 100 based on reviews from 39 critics, indicating "mixed or average reviews". Audiences surveyed by CinemaScore gave the film a B+ rating.

Glenn Kenny of RogerEbert.com gave the film a scathing review, writing that it "grated on my nerves...while everything Stiller attempts here has a real professional polish, what Mitty lacks is any sense of what life might actually be like for the kind of 'ordinary man' Mitty represents." Peter Debruge of Variety magazine criticized the film for lacking the satirical tone of the original story, comparing the film to "a feature-length 'Just Do It' ad" for the middle-aged audience the film was targeting. Debruge noted that the script downplayed the comedy, and that a scene inspired by The Curious Case of Benjamin Button shows the film could have been made funnier, but that the more serious emotional dimension ultimately made the film feel more substantial.

The film had its share of admirers. Peter Travers of Rolling Stone gave the film a positive review, saying "In his uniquely funny and unexpectedly tender movie, Stiller takes us on a personal journey of lingering resonance." Joe Neumaier of New York Daily awarded the film five out of five stars, saying "The story Stiller tells manages to float in a most peculiar, satisfying way." Political radio show host and film critic Michael Medved was also positive concerning the film, calling it "one of the feel-good movies of the year."

The film was criticized for the product placement of several brands which featured prominently in the storyline.

In 2016, Rolling Stone magazine asked readers to choose their top 10 Ben Stiller movies. The Secret Life of Walter Mitty was rated as Stiller's third-best film.

Accolades

Soundtrack
 "Maneater" – Performed by Grace Mitchell
 "Escape (The Piña Colada Song)" – Written by Rupert Holmes
 "Wake Up" – Performed by Arcade Fire
 "Don't You Want Me" – Written by Phil Oakey, Philip Adrian Wright (as Philip Wright), and Jo Callis
 "Far Away" – Performed by José González
 "Far Away" – Performed by Junip
 "Space Oddity" – Performed by David Bowie and Kristen Wiig (uncredited)
 "Lake Michigan" – Performed by Rogue Wave
 "Dirty Paws" – Performed by Of Monsters and Men
 "The Wolves and the Ravens" – Performed by Rogue Valley (Chris Koza)
 "Stay Alive" – Performed by José González
 "Step Out" – Performed by José González
 "Don't Let It Pass" – Performed by Junip
 "Escape (The Piña Colada Song)" – Performed by Jack Johnson
 "#9 Dream" – Performed by José González, written by John Lennon

"Space Oddity"

The song "Space Oddity" by David Bowie plays a significant role throughout the film. Walter Mitty is referred to mockingly as "Major Tom" by his new boss, Hendricks, in reference to the astronaut Major Tom in "Space Oddity", due to his frequent daydreaming: the boss interprets the line "ground control to Major Tom" as akin to "Earth to Walter; come in Walter". Cheryl later tells Walter that Hendricks misunderstands the song, as "it’s about courage and venturing into the unknown".

The song is featured in a crucial scene in which Mitty decides to leap onto a helicopter after imagining Cheryl singing the song. Stiller talked about the importance of "Space Oddity" in that scene during an interview in which he said that, "I felt like the way it fits into the story, we got to this point and this scene which was sort of how the fantasy and reality come together for Walter, and that was what that came out of. That song, and what he mentioned in his head, and what he imagines and what he does, it all just seemed to come together over that song."

See also

Notes

References

External links

  
 
 
 

2010s adventure comedy-drama films
2010s fantasy adventure films
2010s fantasy comedy-drama films
2013 films
American adventure comedy-drama films
American fantasy adventure films
American fantasy comedy-drama films
Remakes of American films
Films about businesspeople
Films based on short fiction
Films based on works by James Thurber
Films directed by Ben Stiller
Films produced by Ben Stiller
Films scored by Theodore Shapiro
Films set in Greenland
Films set in Iceland
Films set in New York City
Films shot in British Columbia
Films shot in Iceland
Films shot in Los Angeles
Films shot in New York City
Life (magazine)
New Line Cinema films
Red Hour Productions films
Samuel Goldwyn Films films
20th Century Fox films
Termination of employment in popular culture
TSG Entertainment films
Works about magazine publishing
Works about photojournalism
2010s English-language films
2010s American films